Mamadyshsky Uyezd (Мамады́шский уе́зд) was one of the subdivisions of the Kazan Governorate of the Russian Empire. It was situated in the northeastern part of the governorate. Its administrative centre was Mamadysh.

Demographics
At the time of the Russian Empire Census of 1897, Mamadyshsky Uyezd had a population of 189,795. Of these, 69.4% spoke Tatar, 25.1% Russian, 4.4% Udmurt and 1.0% Mari as their native language.

References

 
Uezds of Kazan Governorate
Kazan Governorate